Liquefied natural gas (LNG) is the liquefied form of natural gas, which has a much smaller volume than natural gas in its gaseous form. This liquefied condition is used to facilitate the carriage of natural gas over long distances, often by sea, in specialized tanks.

LNG port terminals are purpose-built port terminals designed to accommodate large LNG carrier ships designed to load, carry and unload LNG. These LNG terminals are located adjacent to a gas liquefaction and storage plant (export), or to a gas regasification and storage plant (import), which are themselves connected to gas pipelines connected to on-shore or off-shore gas fields (export) or to storage and distribution plants (import).

Existing liquefaction terminals

Africa

Asia
 Malaysia LNG, Tanjung Kidurong, Bintulu, Malaysia
 Brunei LNG, Lumut, Brunei
 Arun, Indonesia
 Bangladesh
 Badak NGL, Indonesia
 Tangguh, Indonesia
 , Central Sulawesi, Indonesia
 RGTSU, Sungai Udang, Melaka, Malaysia

Russia
 Portovaya LNG, near the Nord Stream 1 compressor station at Portovaya, near Vyborg, Leningrad oblast. It started operation on two trains in September 2022.
 Sakhalin LNG, Sakhalin, Russia - (Sakhalin Energy Investment Company Ltd.)
 Yamal LNG, in Sabetta, on the Yamal Peninsula, in Russia.

Middle East
 ADGAS
 Oman LNG
 Qalhat LNG, Oman
Qatar LNG total production will increase from 77 million tonnes per annum(mtpa) in 2021(21% export market share) to 110 mtpa in 2026, then 126 mtpa in 2027.
 Qatargas Ras Laffan LNG plant, Ras Laffan, Qatar, see on a map
 ADGAS Plant, Das Island, Abu Dhabi, United Arab Emirates
 Yemen LNG(Total), Balhaf, Yemen

South America
 Peru LNG, Pampa Melchorita, Peru
 Tango FLNG, Argentina, 2019 
 Atlantic LNG, Trinidad and Tobago

Australia

Europe
 Hammerfest LNG, liquifies gas from the Snøhvit undersea field. Located at Hammerfest, Norway. Operated by Equinor ASA.
 Risavika Liquefaction Plant, Risavika, Sola, Norway. Operated by North Sea Midstream Partners Limited (NSMP). Liquifies both natural gas and biogas by pipeline from Kårstø.

North America

Kenai LNG, Nikiski, Alaska 
Cheniere Energy Sabine Pass terminal (Louisiana)
Cove Point LNG, Maryland terminal
Cheniere Energy Corpus Christi terminal, Texas
Freeport LNG terminal, Quintana Island, Texas
Cameron LNG, Hackberry, Louisiana 
Southern LNG, Elba Island, Georgia - (Kinder Morgan) (under construction)
Costa Azul LNG near Ensenada, Baja California, Mexico
Solensa (small scale) near Monterrey, Mexico

Existing regasification terminals

Argentina
 Bahia Blanca Gasport, YPF, 2008
 GNL Escobar, ENARSA/YPF, 2011

Bangladesh 

 Moheshkhali floating LNG terminal, Excelerate Energy, 2018
 Summit LNG, Summit Corporation, 2019

Belgium
 Zeebrugge LNG terminal, in Zeebrugge. Operated by Fluxys. Entered service in 1987, total storage capacity of 560,000 m3, 2 jetties and a regasification capacity of 9,000,000,000 m3 per year.

Brazil
 Pecém, State of Ceará
 Bahia LNG Regasification Terminal, Bay of All Saints, State of Bahia
 Guanabara Bay, State of Rio de Janeiro
 TPP Porto de Sergipe I, Barra dos Coqueiros, State of Sergipe. [Private Terminal]

Canada
 Saint John LNG, Saint John, NB

Chile

 GNL, Quintero
 GNL, Mejillones

China
 Dapeng LNG Terminal, Shenzhen, Guangdong province
 Fujian LNG Terminal, Putian, Fujian province
 Shanghai LNG Terminal, Yangshan Port, Shanghai
 Dalian LNG Terminal, Dalian, Liaoning province
 Ningbo LNG Terminal, Ningbo, Zhejiang province
 Rudong LNG Terminal, Nantong, Jiangsu province
Qidong LNG Terminal, Qidong, Jiangsu province
 Tangshan LNG Terminal, Caofeidian, Hebei province
 Tianjin LNG Terminal, Binhai New Area, Tianjin
Tianjin LNG Terminal, Nangang Industrial Zone, Tianjin
 Zhuhai LNG Terminal, Zhuhai, Guangdong province
 Qingdao LNG Terminal, Jiaonan, Shandong province
 Shenzhen LNG Terminal, Shenzhen, Guangdong province
 Hainan LNG Terminal, Yangpu Economic Development Zone, Hainan
 Guangxi LNG Terminal, Beihai, Guangxi
Zhoushan LNG Terminal, Zhoushan, Zhejiang province
Dongguan LNG Terminal, Dongguan, Guangdong province
Yuedong LNG Terminal, Jieyang, Guangdong province

Colombia

 Sociedad Portuaria El Cayao LNG (SPEC), Cartagena de Indias.

Croatia

Krk LNG terminal

Dominican Republic
 AES-Andres LNG Terminal

Finland
 Inkoo LNG terminal, Finland's first marine LNG shipping terminal, situated near Ingå, Finland on the Gulf of Finland.  Became operational in January 2023, ten months after the cutoff of Russian pipeline gas in the aftermath of the 2022 Russian invasion of Ukraine. Can also be used to supply gas to the Baltic countries as well in the future via Balticconnector.
 Hamina, Hamina LNG terminal. Joint venture of Haminan Energia Oy, Alexela and Wärtsilä. The terminal offers truck loading and LNG ship bunkering as well as regasification for both local industry and the Finnish national gas grid. Full open market access begins on 1. October 2022.
 Pori, LNG terminal. Owner a Gasum company Skangas Oy (LNG regasification & LNG distribution)
 Manga LNG terminal, Röyttä, Tornio. Owners Outokumpu Oyj, SSAB Oy, Skangas Oy and EPV Energia Oy (LNG regasification & LNG distribution)

France
 in Fos-sur-Mer near Marseille. Entered service in 2010, total storage capacity of 330,000 m3, 1 jetty, and a regasification capacity of 8,250,000,000 m3 per year.
 in Fos-sur-Mer near Marseille. Operated by Elengy, a subsidiary of Engie. Entered service in 1972, total storage capacity of 150,000 m3, 1 jetty and a regasification capacity of 5,500,000,000 m3 per year.
 in Loon-Plage, near Dunkirk. Founded by Électricité de France (65%), Fluxys (25%) and Total S.A. (10%), and then changed in 2018 with the terminal being owned and operated by Dunkerque LNG, a company 61% owned by a consortium made up of Belgium gas infrastructure group Fluxys, AXA Investment Managers-Real Assets, and Crédit Agricole Assurances, and 39% owned by a consortium of Korean investors led by IPM Group in cooperation with Samsung Asset Management. Entered service in 2017, total storage capacity of 600,000 m3, 2 jetties, and a regasification capacity of 13,000,000,000 m3 per year.
, in Montoir-de-Bretagne near Nantes. Operated by Elengy, a subsidiary of Engie. Entered service in 1980, total storage capacity of 360,000 m3, 2 jetties, and a regasification capacity of 10,000,000,000 m3 per year.

Greece

Revithoussa LNG Terminal, on Revithoussa island near Athens. Operated by DESFA, a subsidiary of DEPA. Entered service in 1999, total storage capacity of 130,000 m3, 1 jetty, and a regasification capacity of 5,500,000,000 m3 per year.

India

 Konkan LNG Private Limited, Dabhol, Maharashtra, 5 million tonnes per year.
 Dahej Terminal, Petronet LNG Ltd, Gujarat - 15 million tonnes per year and 17.5 million tonnes per year by 2018 end.
 Hazira Terminal, Shell Ltd, Gujarat - 5 million tonnes per year
Kochi Terminal, Petronet LNG Ltd. - 5 million tonnes per year
 [(Mundra)] Terminal, GSPC LNG Ltd. - 5 million tonnes per year
(Chennai) Terminal, INDIAN OIL LNG(Joint venture of Indian Oil Corporation) - 5 million tonnes per year https://www.indianoillng.com/
Jaigarh LNG Terminal, First FSRU Terminal, H-Energy https://www.henergy.com/news3

Israel 

 Hadera Deepwater LNG Terminal, INGL, 2013

Italy

Adriatic LNG Terminal, offshore near Rovigo. Operated by ExxonMobil (70,7%), QatarEnergy (22%), Snam (7,3%). Entered service in 2009, total storage capacity of 250,000 m3, 1 jetty, and a regasification capacity of 9,000,000,000 m3 per year.
, near La Spezia. Entered service in 1971, total storage capacity of 100,000 m3, 1 jetty, and a regasification capacity of 3,864,000,000 m3 per year.
, offshore near Livorno. Operated by OLT Offshore (a joint venture of  (49.07%), Uniper (48.24%), and Golar LNG (2.69%)). Entered service in 2013, total storage capacity of 137,100 m3, 1 jetty, and an authorized regasification capacity of 3,750,000,000 m3 per year.

Japan

Tōhoku region and Hokkaido region
 Shin Minato LNG terminal, Sendai Gas, 0.08M m3, opened 1997
 Hachinohe LNG terminal (Re-shipment), Nippon Oil, 0.04M m3, open 2006
 Hakodate LNG terminal (Re-shipment), open 2006
Chūbu region
 Higashi Niigata LNG terminal, Tohoku Electric, 0.72M m3, open 1984
 Sodeshi LNG terminal, Shimizu LNG and Shizuoka Gas, 0.177M m3, open 1996
 Chita Kyodo LNG terminal, Chubu Electric and Toho Gas, 0.3M m3, open 1977
 Chita LNG terminal, Chita LNG, Chubu Electric and Toho Gas, 0.64M m3, open 1983
 Yokkaichi LNG Centre, Toho Gas, 0.32M m3, open 1987
 Yokkaichi Works LNG terminal, Chubu Electric, 0.16M m3, open 1991
 Kawagoe LNG terminal, Chubu Electric, 0.48M m3, open 1997
 Chita Midorihama LNG terminal, Toho Gas, 0.2M m3, open 2001
 Joetsu LNG terminal, Chubu Electric, 0.54M m3, open 2011
 Naoetsu LNG terminal, Inpex, 0.36M m3, open 2013
Kantō region
 Futtsu LNG terminal, Tokyo Electric, 1.11M m3, open 1985
 Sodegaura LNG terminal, Tokyo Electric and Tokyo Gas, 2.66M m3, open 1973
 Higashi Ohgishima LNG terminal, Tokyo Electric, 0.54M m3, open 1984
 Ohgishima LNG terminal, Tokyo Gas, 0.6M m3, open 1998
 Negishi LNG terminal, Tokyo Electric and Tokyo Gas, 1.25M m3, open 1969
Kansai region
 Senboku 1 LNG terminal, Osaka Gas, 0.18M m3, open 1972
 Senboku 2 LNG terminal, Osaka Gas, 1.51M m3, open 1972
 Himeji LNG terminal, Osaka Gas, 0.52M m3, open 1977
 Himeji Joint LNG terminal, Osaka Gas and Kansai Electric, 1.44M m3, open 1984
 Sakai LNG terminal, Sakai LNG and Kansai Electric and Iwatani Corporation and Cosmo Oil, 0.56M m3, open 2010
Shikoku region
 Sakaide LNG terminal, Shikoku Electric Power, 0.18M m3, open 2010
Chūgoku region
 Hatsukaichi LNG terminal, Hiroshima Gas, 0.17M m3, 1996
 Yanai LNG terminal, Chugoku Electric Power, 0.48M m3, 1990
 Mizushima LNG terminal, Mizushima LNG and Chugoku Electric Power and Nippon Oil, 0.16M m3, 2006
Kyūshū region and Okinawa
 Ōita LNG terminal, Oita LNG and Kyushu Electric Power and Kyushu Oil and Oita Gas, 0.46M m3, 1990
 Tobata LNG terminal, Kitakyushu LNG and Kyushu Electric Power and Nippon Steel, 0.48M m3, 1997
 Fukuoka LNG terminal, Seibu Gas, 0.07M m3, 1993
 Kagoshima LNG terminal, Kagoshima Gas, 0.036M m3, 1996
 Nagasaki LNG terminal, Seibu Gas, 0.035M m3, 2003
 Nakagusuku LNG terminal, Okinawa Electric Power, 0.7M m3, due to open 2010

Kuwait

 Mina Al-Ahmadi Gasport, 2009 (KNPC)

Lithuania

Klaipėda LNG Terminal offshore Klaipėda. Operated by Klaipėdos Nafta. Entered service in 2014, total storage capacity of 170,000 m3, 1 jetty, and a gasification capacity of 4,000,000,000 m3.

Mexico

 Altamira LNG near Tampico, Mexico, Shell, opened August 2006
 Manzanillo LNG in Manzanillo, Colima, Mexico, Mitsui + Korea Gas + Samsung, opened 2011
 Solensa LNG (Small Scale), near Monterrey, Mexico

Netherlands
 Gate terminal, Rotterdam, opened September 2011
 Eemshaven LNG Terminal (EemsEnergyTerminal). Floating, operated by Gasunie, opened September 2022

Norway
Mosjøen LNG-terminal, Mosjøen. Operated by Gasnor AS. Provides LNG delivery by truck, to augment production of liquid biogas from waste.
 Øra LNG-terminal, Fredrikstad. Operated by Gasum Oy. Supplies pipeline natural gas to local industrial area, as well as LNG bunkering for vessels and LNG delivery by truck.
 Ålesund LNG-terminal, Bingsa, Ålesund. Operated by Gasum Oy. Supplies pipeline gas to local industry and LNG delivery by truck. Opened in 2010.

Pakistan

 Engro Enengy Terminal Private Limited (EETPL), Port Qasim, Karachi
 Pakistan GasPort Consortium Limited (PGPC)—the wholly owned subsidiary of Pakistan GasPort Limited (PGPL)—owns and operates the 750mmscfd LNG import terminal at Mazhar Point, Port Qasim, Karachi.

Poland

Świnoujście LNG terminal, Świnoujście (Wolin Island)

Portugal

Sines LNG Terminal, REN

Singapore

Singapore LNG Terminal. Commenced commercial operation on Q2 2013

South Korea

Pyeongtaek, KOGAS
Incheon, KOGAS
Tongyeong, KOGAS
Samcheok, KOGAS
Jejudo, KOGAS
Gwangyang, POSCO
Boryeong, GS Energy and SK E&S

Spain

Barcelona (Enagás)
Bilbao (consortium including Enagás, Ente Vasco de la Energia and RREEF), see on a map
Huelva (Enagás), see on a map
Sagunto, Valencia (consortium including Enagás, Osaka Gas and Oman Oil Holdings)
Cartagena (Enagás), see on a map
 Mugardos Ferrol Harbour (Reganosa, starting in 2007)
Gijón (Enagás, starting in 2012)

Sweden
 Lysekil LNG terminal, Lysekil. Joint venture by Gasum Oy and Preem. Delivers LNG by truck as well as pipeline gas to Preem's oil refinery. Opened in 2014.
 Nynäshamn LNG, Brunnviksholmen, Nynäshamn. Operated by Gasum Oy. Delivers LNG by truck and LNG bunker, as well as pipeline gas to local industrial grid. Operation started in 2011 and partly opened to open market in 2021.

Taiwan
 Guantang LNG Terminal, Taoyuan, Taiwan (planning)
 Taichung LNG Terminal, Taichung, Taiwan
 Yongan LNG Terminal, Kaohsiung, Taiwan

Thailand

Map Ta Phut LNG Terminal Phase#1: 2 x 160,000 m3 for Tanks Capacity, PTT and EGAT Phase#2: extra tanks (same size).  Phase#1 Completed & Commenced Commercial Operation Date in 2011.(First commissioning by LNG vessel in May 2011.  5 million tonnes per year, additional 5 million tonnes per year by 2017 under construction)

Turkey

Marmara Ereğlisi LNG Storage Facility, Marmara Ereğlisi, BOTAŞ
Egegaz Aliağa LNG Storage Facility, Aliağa, Egegaz
Etki terminal , FSRU TURQUOISE P  , Aliağa, Pardus Energy
Botaş Dörtyol LNG Storage Facility, Dörtyol, BOTAŞ
Botaş Saros FSRU Terminal, Gulf of Saros, BOTAŞ, under construction as of 2022

United Arab Emirates (UAE)

 Jebel Ali LNG Import Terminal, Dubai, started 2010 (DUSUP)
 Ruwais LNG Import Terminal, Abu Dhabi, 2016 (ADNOC)

United Kingdom

South Hook LNG, Milford Haven, South Wales
Dragon LNG terminal, Milford Haven, South Wales
Grain LNG, Isle of Grain, Kent

United States and Puerto Rico

The following LNG off-loading and regasification terminals are located in the United States and Gulf of Mexico:

Dominion Cove Point LNG, LP, Lusby, Maryland - (Dominion Resources)
Southern LNG, Elba Island, Georgia - (Kinder Morgan)
Trunkline LNG, Lake Charles, Louisiana - (Trunkline LNG Company, LLC)
EcoEléctrica, Punta Guyanilla, Puerto Rico
 Golden Pass LNG, rural Jefferson County, Texas - (Golden Pass LNG)
 Sabine Pass LNG, rural Cameron Parish, Louisiana - (Cheniere Energy, Inc.)

 Cameron LNG, rural Cameron Parish, Louisiana - (Sempra Energy)
 Freeport LNG, Freeport, Texas - (Freeport LNG Development, LP)
 Everett Marine Terminal, Everett, Massachusetts - (Exelon Corporation)
 Gulf LNG, Pascagoula, Mississippi - (Kinder Morgan)
Gulf Gateway Deepwater Port, Gulf of Mexico - (Excelerate Energy LP) (decommissioned)
Northeast Gateway Deepwater Port, offshore from Gloucester, Massachusetts,(Excelerate Energy LP)
Neptune LNG, offshore from Gloucester, Massachusetts,(GDf Suez)

Proposed liquefaction terminals

Asia Pacific

China 
 Jingbian Terminal, Yulin, Shaanxi Province - (China Natural Gas 100%) - to be completed December 2009

Papua New Guinea 
PNG LNG, Port Moresby, Papua New Guinea - (estimated 2013) - (ExxonMobil 41.6%, Oil Search 34.1%, Santos 17.7%, AGL 3.6%, Nippon Oil 1.8% and Mineral Resource Development Corporation 1.2%)

Russia (Asia)
Yamal LNG, Yamal, Russia
In March 2021 the Russian Government authorised a long-term programme to develop three more LNG plants (plus five more potential plants):
Arctic LNG-2 plant (East of Yamal, Novatek) - Completion expected in 2023-2025
Arctic LNG-1 plant (Novatek) - Completion expected after 2027
Yakutsk LNG plant (Yatek) - Completion expected in 2026-2027

North America

Canada

 Energie Saguenay, Quebec
Goldboro LNG, Goldboro, Nova Scotia
Kitimat LNG, Kitimat, British Columbia
LNG Canada, Kitimat, British Columbia
 Woodfibre LNG, Woodfibre, British Columbia

United States 

The United States has had a massive shift in LNG terminal planning and construction starting in 2010-2011 due to a rapid increase in US domestic natural gas supply with the widespread adoption of hydraulic fracturing petroleum recovery technology. Many brand-new LNG import terminals are planning or have begun addition of liquefaction facilities to operate as export terminals.

On 21 November 2019, U.S. regulators approved permits for three new liquified natural gas export terminals in the Rio Grande Valley in Texas. The Federal Energy Regulatory Commission approved permits for Rio Grande LNG, Annova LNG and Texas LNG with each of the three companies intending to build their LNG plant and terminal at the Port of Brownsville. One month after approval, the Sierra Club and other environmental groups asked the FERC to reconsider the permits, saying the agency failed to adequately consider environmental impacts.

The following six projects are in various stages of planning according to the US Federal regulatory authority as of May 2020.

Operational
 Venture Global LNG, Calcasieu Pass, Louisiana. 

Pending Applications
 Commonwealth LNG, Cameron Parish, LA
 Sempra–Port Arthur LNG, Trains 3 & 4, Port Arthur, TX

Projects in Pre-Filing
 Port Fourchon LNG, LaFourche Parish, LA 
 Galveston Bay LNG, Galveston Bay, TX 
 Pointe LNG, Plaquemines Parish, LA 
 Delta LNG, Plaquemines Parish, LA

South America

Peru

Peru LNG, Pampa Melchorita, Cañete, Peru

Australia

Barrow Island - Chevron Corporation proposes to build an LNG facility and loading terminal on Barrow Island, Western Australia, as part of its Gorgon Project. (COMPLETED 2016)
 Australia Pacific LNG - Origin Energy, ConocoPhillips and Sinopec - Curtis Island, Queensland.
 Arrow LNG - Arrow Energy - Curtis Island, Queensland.
Gladstone LNG - Santos, Petronas, Total and KOGAS  - Curtis Island, Queensland.
Wheatstone LNG, is a liquefied natural gas plant operating in the Ashburton North Strategic Industrial Area, which is located 12 kilometres (7.5 mi) west of Onslow, Western Australia. The project is operated by Chevron Australia Pty. Ltd. (COMPLETED 2019)

Europe

Cyprus
 Vassiliko LNG, Limassol, Cyprus

Russia (Europe)
 Baltic LNG at Ust-Luga (Gazprom and RusGazDobycha)
Shtokmann LNG, Murmansk, Russia

Proposed regasification terminals

Australia

AGL Gas Import Jetty, Crib Point

Bangladesh

Matarbari LNG Terminal, Maheshkhali

Chile

 GNL Mejillones (In operation)
 GNL Quintero (In operation)
 GNL Penco

Estonia
 Paldiski LNG (developed by Alexela)

France
Fos-Faster LNG terminal, planned start of commercial operation 2019

Germany
Stade LNG Terminal
Brunsbüttel LNG Terminal, to be operated by a joint venture consisting of Gasunie, Oiltanking and Vopak. Final decision 
Wilhelmshaven LNG terminal

Greece
 Alexandroupolis INGS, planned with total storage capacity of 170,000 m3, and a regasification capacity of 6,100,000,000 m3 per year.
 Crete LNG Terminal, planned
 Kavala LNG Terminal, planned

Hong Kong
 An FSRU (floating storage regasification unit) in the waters to the east of the Soko Islands

India
Pipavav LNG Terminal (APM Terminals)
Mangalore LNG Terminal Ltd
Paradip LNG Terminal (GAIL)-4.8 mt/year
Kakinada LNG Terminal owned by GAIL, GDF SUEZ and Shell. 5 mt/year.
Kakinada LNG Terminal owned by VGS Cavallo, 3.6 mt/year.
Kakinada LNG Terminal owned by H-Energy (GMR), 1.75 mt/year.
Vizag LNG Terminal owned by Petronet LNG, 10 mt/year.
Chhara LNG Terminal (HPLNG) - 5 mmtpa (https://www.hplng.in/index) under construction
 Dhamra LNG Terminal (DLTPL, Adani-Total)

Indonesia
East Java by 2011, Pertamina
West Java by 2011, Pertamina Gas Negara (PGN) and Pertamina
North Sumatra by 2011 by PGN
The country also has liquefaction terminals in more remote areas for export, and imports from the Middle East in areas with dense population.

Ireland
Shannon LNG Terminal. Shannon LNG

Italy
Porto Empedocle LNG Terminal

Japan
Hitachi LNG Terminal, Tokyo Gas, 2017 possible start date.

Latvia
A terminal in Riga

Mexico
TGNL - Manzanillo, Colima scheduled to open 2011

Myanmar
A terminal in Kanbauk in Tanintharyi Region is expected to open in the middle of 2020, through JV of French company Total and Germany's Siemens for the 1,230MW capacity in 48 months
A terminal in Mee Laung Gyaing in Ayeyarwady Region, is a US$2.5 Billion JV of China's Zhefu and local Myanmar company Supreme Group will undertake a 1,390MW LNG project, with the first phase to be completed in 36 months and full capacity ready in 42 months
A terminal in Ahlone in Yangon Region a Thailand company TTCL – better known as Toyo Thai to will build a 356MW LNG plant. This is expected to be completed in 28 months
A terminal in Kyaukphyu in Rakhine State a JV of China's Sinohydro and Myanmar Local company Supreme Group will build another 135MW combined-cycle gas turbine project which is expected to be completed in 28 months with the Ahlone terminal

Netherlands
LionGas Terminal, Europoort, Rotterdam. Canceled.

Pakistan
 Energas LNG Terminal (Pvt) Limited Port Qasim, Karachi
 Tabeer Energy (Pvt) Limited (TEPL) Port Qasim, Karachi
 Gwadar Gas Port Limited (GGPL) Gwadar

Philippines
A First Gen LNG Terminal, Batangas City, Philippines
A terminal in Sulu Southwestern Philippines in the Island of Mindanao
A terminal in Cebu central Philippines of Phinma Petroleum and Geothermal (PPG), floating storage and regasification unit (FSRU) have already been completed and the entire project is expected to be completed in 2022
Another US$1.7 billion LNG Terminal to power Luzon to be built by South Korea's SK E&S with signed MOU with he Korean Ministry of Trade, Industry and Energy and the Philippines Department of Energy signed during the visit of the Philippine President Rodrigo Duterte in South Korea

Russia
Kaliningrad LNG Terminal

South Korea
North East Asia LNG Hub Terminal

Thailand
Map Ta Phut LNG Terminal/ Project expansion for Phase 2.

Ukraine
Proposed terminal near Odessa, on 26 November 2012 the Ukrainian government and Unión Fenosa (were believed to have) signed an agreement on its building but Unión Fenosa denies this and it claimed on 28 November 2012 "nor are we leading any consortium to develop such a terminal ... nor are we studying anything along these lines". The terminal was due to start working at a capacity of 5 billion cubic meters a year by 2016.

See also 
 CNOOC#LNG terminals
 List of natural gas pipelines

References

 
Technology-related lists